The Romance of Rosy Ridge is a 1947 American Western film directed by Roy Rowland, about a rural community bitterly divided during the aftermath of the American Civil War. It stars Van Johnson, Thomas Mitchell, and Janet Leigh in her film debut. It was adapted from the novel of the same name by MacKinlay Kantor.

Plot
Henry Carson, a schoolteacher before the Civil War, shows up in a rural region of the Missouri hills. He spends the night with a family consisting of Gill MacBean, his wife Sairy, and two of their children, young woman Lissy Anne and youngster Andrew. Another son, Ben, had run off to fight in the war; the family's hope that he will someday return is gradually waning.

Gill does not welcome the stranger, unsure of his allegiance, but the others like the good-natured young man, especially Lissy Anne. Henry offers to help with the farming; the MacBeans desperately need more hands, but Gill remains very suspicious of his motives. A band had been burning the barns of those still loyal to the defeated Confederacy; the MacBeans had been the latest victims. Henry, however, proves to be a hard worker.

When storekeeper and unofficial banker Cal Baggett visits the family to ask about repayment of a loan, Henry talks him into hosting a "play party", inviting everyone, regardless of affiliation, to help heal the rift in the community. Gill is strongly opposed to it, but Henry tricks him into bringing his family.

At first, the two groups do not mix, but Sairy talks Northern sympathizer Dan Yeary into dancing with her, breaking the ice. Soon, everyone is having a very good time. However, an argument breaks out about the playing of a tune associated with the North. To forestall a fight, Cal calls for a vote. Unfortunately, it is a tie. Gill calls upon Henry to cast the deciding vote. Henry is finally forced to reveal that he fought for the Union. After that, the party quickly breaks up, much to the secret delight of John Dessark and his son Badge.

Henry is no longer welcome at the MacBeans. He does not leave the area though; he starts building a schoolhouse.

Eventually, Lissy Anne can no longer bear to be apart from Henry. She walks away into the night with him, without her father's knowledge but with her mother's approval. Gill tracks them down with a bloodhound, intending to shoot his would-be son-in-law. When five masked nightriders approach, Henry strikes Gill unconscious and seizes his rifle. The horsemen start shooting to kill. Taking cover Henry kills four and captures the fifth after a lengthy footchase and fistfight at a burnt-out dwelling. It is Badge Dessark. He confesses that his father is behind the raids, not out of loyalty to the South, but simply for financial profit. With the Dessarks hanged, the community starts to heal.

Finally, Henry reveals why he sought out the MacBeans. In a flashback, it is revealed that he first met Ben as they were walking across the hills to enlist in the war. As they traveled together singing and laughing, they became good friends. Approaching the turn-off signpost they decided in jest on a foot race to see who could be the first to reach it. Henry ended up on the north branch, with Ben on the south. They were stunned by their differing allegiances. Henry ultimately persuaded Ben into coming with him. Two days before the war's end, Ben was killed suddenly. Before dying, he made Henry promise to help the family with the harvest. After hearing this, a teary-eyed Gill gives Henry and Lissy Anne his blessing to get married.

Cast
 Van Johnson as Henry Carson
 Thomas Mitchell as Gill MacBean
 Janet Leigh as Lissy Anne MacBean
 Marshall Thompson as Ben MacBean
 Selena Royle as Sairy MacBean
 Charles Dingle as John Dessark
 Dean Stockwell as Andrew MacBean
 Guy Kibbee as Cal Baggett
 Elisabeth Risdon as Emily Baggett
 Jim Davis as Badge Dessark
 Russell Simpson as Dan Yeary
 O.Z. Whitehead as Ninny Nat 
 James Bell as John Willhart
 Joyce Arling as Mrs. Willhart
 William Bishop as Ad Buchanan
 Paul Langton as Tom Veary

Reception
According to MGM records, the film earned $1,820,000 in the US and Canada and $625,000 elsewhere, resulting in a loss of $533,000.

See also
 List of American films of 1947

References

External links
 The Romance of Rosy Ridge at IMDB
 
 
 

1947 films
American black-and-white films
Films based on American novels
Metro-Goldwyn-Mayer films
1947 romantic drama films
American Western (genre) films
1947 Western (genre) films
Films directed by Roy Rowland
American romantic drama films
Films based on works by MacKinlay Kantor
1940s American films